Michael Berrer (born 1 July 1980) is a German retired professional tennis player. He reached his career-high singles ranking of world No. 42 in May 2010.

Career

2010

He reached the quarterfinal at the Aircel Chennai Open in January, losing to Stanislas Wawrinka in the quarterfinals.
At the 2010 Australian Open he was defeated by Denis Istomin in the second round after beating Kristof Vliegen in straight sets.
In the second week of the Australian Open, he played at Heilbronn Challenger. He won the tournament after defeating Andrey Golubev in two sets. The following week he reached his first ATP World Tour final at the PBZ Zagreb Indoors, which he lost to Marin Čilić 4–6, 7–6(5), 3–6.

At the Dubai Tennis Championships in February, he defeated Sergiy Stakhovsky and Nikolay Davydenko to reach the third round, where he lost to Marcos Baghdatis, 6–7(5), 1–6.
He lost the opener at the BNP Paribas Open in Indian Wells to Mardy Fish in three sets. He won the first round of the Sony Ericsson Open in Miami, before falling to Feliciano López in the second round. At his first clay court tournament of the year in Monte-Carlo, he beat Evgeny Korolev and Juan Mónaco en route to a third-round showdown against Rafael Nadal, which he lost, 0–6, 1–6. After this, he lost his next three opening matches.

At the French Open, he was again knocked out in the first round by Mardy Fish in five sets.
He then suffered from an ankle injury. He made his next appearance in Wimbledon one month later, where he had to retire during his first-round match against Illya Marchenko. He then experienced two more first-round exits in Stuttgart and Hamburg in July.

In August, he reached the second round at the Legg Mason Tennis Classic, losing to Fernando Verdasco. Two weeks later he defeated Tommy Robredo at the ATP World Tour Masters 1000 in Cincinnati, before losing to Richard Gasquet in two sets. At the 2010 US Open, Berrer fell to countryman Andreas Beck in the first round, 6–7(3), 3–6, 1–6.

In September, he reached the second round of the Open de Moselle in Metz, after beating Rainer Schüttler in two sets. He lost to Philipp Kohlschreiber, 4–6, 2–6.
As no. 51, he qualified for the China Open in Beijing. In the first round of the main draw he defeated world no. 7 Tomáš Berdych in three sets, before losing to Gilles Simon, 7–6, 4–6, 6–7, in over three hours.
Berrer beat Guillermo García-López, Pablo Cuevas, and Marcos Baghdatis en route to the semifinal in Vienna, where he lost to Austrian lucky loser Andreas Haider-Maurer.

2011

At the start of 2011, he again reached the Zagreb final, where he was defeated by Ivan Dodig in straight sets.
He won his first Grand Slam match at the 2011 French Open against 26th seed Milos Raonic, before beating Arnaud Clément in the second round. In the third round, he was defeated 6–2, 6–3, 6–2 by Britain's Andy Murray.

2015

At the start of 2015, Berrer confirmed that it would be his last year as a pro. At the 2015 Qatar Open, he beat world number 3 Rafael Nadal 1–6, 6–3, 6–4 in the first round, after coming from a set down.

2016

At the start of 2016, Michael changed his mind and started his 17th season on tour.

At the 2016 Open Sud de France, he beat world number 38 Borna Ćorić 7–6, 6–2 and Kenny de Schepper 6–3, 6–4 to reach a quarterfinal, where he lost to another young gun a countryman Alexander Zverev 7–6, 2–6, 5–7.

ATP career finals

Singles: 2 (2 runner-ups)

Doubles: 3 (1 title, 2 runner-ups)

ATP Challenger and ITF Futures finals

Singles: 19 (12–7)

Doubles: 5 (0–5)

Performance timeline

Singles

Wins over top 10 players

External links 
 
 
 
 Official website

German male tennis players
Sportspeople from Stuttgart
1980 births
Living people
Tennis people from Baden-Württemberg